Uri Gavriel is an Israeli theater, film and television actor. Winner of the Ophir Award and Karlovy Vary International Film Festival in 2005 as Best Actor in film What a Wonderful Place. In 2018, he appeared as Philip the Apostle in Helen Edmundson's film Mary Magdalene.

Early life
Gavriel was born in Magdiel, Israel, to Mizrahi Jewish immigrant parents from Iraq.

Filmography

References

External linksUri Gavriel at Rotten TomatoesUri Gavriel'' at The New York Times

1955 births
Living people
Israeli male film actors
Israeli film directors
Israeli people of Iraqi-Jewish descent
Israeli Sephardi Jews
Israeli Mizrahi Jews
Israeli male television actors
Jewish Israeli male actors